Luigi Zarcone (18 June 1950, in Villabate – 9 June 2001, in Palermo) was an Italian middle and long distance runner.

Biography
Luigi Zarcone won two medals, at senior level, at the International athletics competitions. He has 32 caps in national team from 1973 to 1983. He died prematurely at only 50 years old, in Palermo in 2001. In his native hometown, Villabate in Sicily, is organized every year since 2003, a race named after him, the Memorial Luigi Zarcone.

Achievements

National titles
Luigi Zarcone has won 4 times the individual national championship.

1 win in the 1500 metres (1974)
2 wins in the 10000 metres (1977, 1979)
1 win in the cross country running (1979)

See also
Italy at the 1979 Mediterranean Games

References

External links
 

1950 births
2001 deaths
Athletics competitors of Fiamme Gialle
Italian male cross country runners
Italian male long-distance runners
Italian male middle-distance runners
Sportspeople from Palermo
Mediterranean Games gold medalists for Italy
Mediterranean Games silver medalists for Italy
Athletes (track and field) at the 1979 Mediterranean Games
Mediterranean Games medalists in athletics